Jeremy Keenan (born 1945) is a British social anthropologist. The regional focuses of his research are the Sahara, North Africa and the Sahel region, and he concentrates on anthropology of development, security and globalisation. He has published a number of books and articles about the approaches of the United States to counter terrorism in Africa.

Keenan has long argued that Islamist terror groups in North Africa are masterminded by Algeria, with the knowledge of the CIA and other intelligence services, which stage "false flag" attacks to expand Algerian and US political influence over the region and its economic resources. In his book "The Dark Sahara", Keenan accuses the United States and Algeria of having conspired to fabricate evidence and exaggerate the threat of al-Qaeda terrorism in Northern Africa. He calls the "global war on terror" a deception and claims that it is causing immense damage to the peoples of the Sahara, namely the Tuareg.

On 22 May 2012, he alleged in a BBC interview that the Algerian government (despite being officially secular) was backing Ansar Dine, both because Ansar Dine justified the existence of the government's security apparatus, and because backing it allowed Algeria to "project power in what it sees as its sphere of influence".

Works
 The Tuareg: People of Ahaggar, Allen Lane, 1977
 Sahara Man: Travelling with the Tuareg, John Murray Publishers, 2001
 The Lesser Gods of the Sahara: Social Change and Contested Terrain Amongst the Tuareg of Algeria, Frank Cass Publishers, 2004
 The Dark Sahara: America's War on Terror in Africa, Pluto Press, 2009
 The Dying Sahara: US Imperialism and Terror in Africa, Pluto Press, 2012
 "Report on In Amenas - Inquest Cover-up and Western Involvement in Algerian State Crimes", International State Crime Initiative (ISCI), 2016''

References

Living people
1945 births
Social anthropologists
Academics of SOAS University of London
British anthropologists
British Africanists
Historians of al-Qaeda in the Islamic Maghreb